The Retro Liga is a footballing league in Poland. The first footballing competition took place in 2017, with the leagues inauguration taking place in 2019, 100 years after the formation of the Polish Football Association.

Creation and rules

The idea of the league was to play with the rules and equipment used in football at the time of the Polish Football Association's formation in 1919. The equipment includes traditional leather boots with wooden studs, cotton shirts, and leather balls were used. The game follows the same rules as those used in 1919, such as no cards, and players only being dismissed after serious foul play, and goalkeepers being able to pick the ball up from back passes. The league structure also went back to those of the pre-war years, such as 2 points for a win instead of the 3 points you get now.

The league also has a clear rule on the teams that can included to participate, the rules being that the club must have ceased to exist by 1939, so only teams that played in the pre-war era and those that were not activated afterwards can be represented in the competition. Initially six teams were to take part in the first season; Lechia Lwów, Czarni Lwów, WKS 10 PP Łowicz, Śmigły Wilno, WKS 37 PP Kutno, and WKS Grodno, however the Czarni Lwów team dropped out before the start of the competition. Owing to the changing of Polish borders after WWII, those teams from cities that are no longer in Poland are played in different cities from where their name suggests, for instance Lechia Lwów, from Lviv now in Ukraine, play in Dzierżoniów. The other clubs whose original cities are now outside of Poland's borders are Śmigły Wilno, from Vilnius now in Lithuania, who play in Warsaw, and WKS Grodno, from Grodno now in Belarus, who play in Kozienice.

History

The first season took place in 2019 with 5 teams taking part, with each team playing each other once home and away for a total of 8 games each over the season. The season saw Lechia Lwów go unbeaten, winning 6 of their 8 games, and conceding only 6 in the process. WKS Grodno and WKS 37 PP Kutno rounded off the top three, while Śmigły Wilno came last having lost all their games and scored only 1 goal.

The second season saw the introduction of the sixth team, Hakoach Będzin. However the COVID-19 pandemic saw a new format for the 2020 season, seeing an introduction of regionalised games, requiring less travel for all teams, before a third place playoff and a final to decide the winners and second placed team, drastically reducing the overall games played. The third place playoff saw Hakoach Będzin playing WKS 37 PP Kutno with the game finishing 1–1. The result of the game on deciding who will finish in third place overall was decided on a coin toss, with the toss favouring Hakoach Będzin. The final saw Lechia Lwów going up against WKS Grodno, winning 2–0 and defending their title.

The 2021 season saw the introduction of Czarni Lwów and Strzelec Białystok. The format returned to the league structure, with the initial plan for each team to play each other twice, however this was revised later with teams playing each other once.

2022 saw yet more teams being included, with Victoria Sosnowiec, Pogoń Lwów, and WKS 42 PP Białystok being introduced for the competitions fourth season.

Teams

Seasons

2019

2020

2021

2022
(Ongoing; ''correct as of 19 September 2022)

Champions

2019: Lechia Lwów
2020: Lechia Lwów
2021: Strzelec Białystok

Team performances

References

Association football competitions in Europe